Hodkovice nad Mohelkou (until 1949 Hodkovice) is a town in Liberec District in the Liberec Region of the Czech Republic. It has about 2,900 inhabitants. The historic town centre is well preserved and is protected by law as an urban monument zone.

Administrative parts
Villages of Jílové, Radoňovice, Záskalí and Žďárek are administrative parts of Hodkovice nad Mohelkou.

Geography
The southern part of the municipal territory with the built-up area lies in the Jičín Uplands.

History
The first settlement in the area of today's town was probably founded in the 11th century. The first written mention of Hodkovice nad Mohelkou is from 1352.

Education
There are two schools in Hodkovice nad Mohelkou, a kindergarten and a primary school. The town founds both organizations.

Sights
The Church of Saint Procopius was built in 1717 on the site of a wooden church, which was destroyed by a fire in 1692.

The main landmark of the town square is the town hall. It was built in 1811, after the previous building burned down. In 1889, it was rebuilt to its current appearance. Other valuable buildings on the square are Marian column from the early 18th century, and the fountain from 1886, which was removed from the square in 1946 and returned in the 1990s.

Transport
The I/35 expressway passes through the town.

The town lies on the railway line leading from Liberec to Jaroměř.

Hodkovice nad Mohelkou Airport (ICAO code: LKHD) is a public domestic airport, one of three airports serving the Liberec Region.

Twin towns – sister cities

Hodkovice nad Mohelkou is twinned with:
 Węgliniec, Poland

Gallery

References

External links

Cities and towns in the Czech Republic
Populated places in Liberec District